A spasso nel tempo – L'avventura continua is a 1997 Italian comedy film directed by Carlo Vanzina. It is a sequel to 1996 film A spasso nel tempo.

Cast
Christian De Sica as Ascanio Orsini Varaldo/Maresciallo Amabile
Massimo Boldi as Walter Boso/Antonio
Marco Messeri as Lorenzo the Magnificent
 as Sofia
 as Rosanna Orsini Varaldo
 as Aspreno Orsini Varaldo
Erica Beltrami as Gina 
 as Giusy
Sergio Solli as Don Gaetano
Laura Valci as young Gina 
 as Baccio
 as Baccio's wife
 as Girolamo Savonarola
David J. Nicholls as Highlander
Antonio Allocca as Don Peppino
 as Nunziatina

References

External links

Films about time travel
Films directed by Carlo Vanzina
1990s Italian-language films
Italian science fiction comedy films
1990s science fiction comedy films
1997 films
1997 comedy films
1990s Italian films